Bagh-e Molla (also Romanized as Bāgh-e Mollā) is a village in Kuhestan Rural District, Rostaq District, Darab County, Fars Province, Iran. At the 2006 census, its population was 96, in 21 families.

References 

Populated places in Darab County